John Willans may refer to:
 John William Willans, British mechanical and electrical engineer
 John Bancroft Willans, English landowner, historian, photographer and philanthropist